Cindy Merlo (born 13 March 1998 in Wald, Zürich) is a Swiss professional squash player. As of March 2019, she was ranked number 83 in the world. She has represented Switzerland internationally, for example at the European Team Championship.

References

1998 births
Living people
Swiss female squash players